Kangshanagar is a village and large market place in Bangladesh. It is situated in Bharella which is in Burichang Upazila, Comilla District. It stands beside the river of Gumti. Approximately 3,747 people live in Kangshanagar.

Roads and highway 

The highway between Comilla and Sylhet passes through Kangshanagar and connect to Dhaka-Chittagong highway in Comilla cantonment. There is another link road which connects Kangshanagar with the biggest highway in Nimshar.

Economy 

The convenient communication to Kangshanagar by river and highway makes it very important to the country. The Kangshanagar Bazar (Kangshanagar Market) supplies vegetables, crops and other agricultural products. Because of the food supplying importance Kangshanagar has two cold storage and so many agricultural storage center. There is more than 500 permanent shops and hundreds of temporary shops. It has two market day in every week, Saturday and Wednesday. During the markets day it becomes very crowded with the inhabitants from the villages around the market place. It has three Hospital with a good number of pharmacy, restaurants, bakery, stationary shops, libraries and other entertainment stations.
Kangshanagar Bazar also famous for its annual "Ghror Bazar" (A place where people buy and sell cows).

Education 

There are 3 educational institutions in Kangshanagar. They are Kangshanagar High School, Kangshanagar Government Primary School and Kangshanagar Islamia Senior (Alim) Madrasha. All of these educational institutes situated in the walking distance from the bus stations.

Public offices 

The economical importance and convenient communication with comilla city make Kangshanagar one of the significant place in the region. This is why it has several important public offices like Bharella Union council office and Regional agricultural center is situated in the southern part of the Kangshanagar Bazar. Because of the commercial importance and for the easier access to the local business man, a branch of government bank Sonali Bank is situated here. A branch of Bangladesh Commerce Bank A branch of Grameen Bank,  BRAC (NGO) & a Dutch Bangla Bank Fast Track ATM is also located in the southern part of the Kangshanagar Bazar.

References

External links 
Varella Union
Burichang Upzilla
Comilla District

Populated places in Chittagong Division